Alfred Hou  is an  Anglican bishop: from 2005 to 2017 he was Assistant Bishop of Malaita, one of the nine dioceses that make up the Anglican Church of Melanesia.

References

Anglican bishops of Malaita
21st-century Anglican bishops in Oceania
Year of birth missing (living people)
Living people